C. J. Marottolo is an American ice hockey coach and former player. He is currently the head coach Sacred Heart and was previously an assistant at Yale.

Career
Marottolo joined the program at Northeastern in 1985 and remained with the team for four seasons. During his time with the Huskies Marottolo was listed as a member of the team but never played in a game and is not listed as having revived a letter. After graduating Marottolo went to France, joining the French division IV Hockey Club de Metz as a player/coach for two years and also coached the Euro-Sport/Drummond Hockey School. In 1992 Marottolo returned to the North Haven area to serve as an assistant at Trinity in Hartford and later transitioned to the same position at Yale.

Marottolo worked for Yale for thirteen seasons, helping the team reach the NCAA tournament in 1998, the first time the program had done so in 46 years. In 2009 the Bulldogs won their first conference tournament championship and returned to the NCAA bracket. Marottolo was expected to continue his role at Yale until Shaun Hannah, the head coach at nearby Sacred Heart, suddenly resigned a month before the 2009–10 season began. Marottolo was enticed to take over as the fourth head coach in program history.

The team responded to the new hire by winning 10 more games than they had done the year before, finishing the year as runner-up for both the regular season and tournament title in Atlantic Hockey and earning Marottolo the conference coach of the year award. The following year, Sacred Heart dropped in the standings and remained there for three years, winning a school-low 2 games in 2013. After the three-year slump the Pioneers started to recover and produced double-digit wins in each of the following five seasons, but weren't able to produce a winning record. Despite the lack of regular season success Sacred Heart has been able to produce a small modicum of positive postseason results, winning three series over eight seasons despite being a lower seed.

College head coaching record

References

External links
 Official Biography, Sacred Heart Pioneers

Year of birth missing (living people)
Living people
American ice hockey coaches
Sacred Heart Pioneers men's ice hockey coaches
People from North Haven, Connecticut
Ice hockey coaches from Connecticut